Taiwan is in a seismically active zone, on the Pacific Ring of Fire, and at the western edge of the Philippine Sea Plate. Geologists have identified 42 active faults on the island, but most of the earthquakes detected in Taiwan are due to the convergence of the Philippine Sea plate and the Eurasian Plate to the east of the island. Most of the earthquakes registered in Taiwan actually occur off the east coast and cause little damage, whereas smaller quakes beneath the island itself have historically proven more destructive. The first recorded earthquake in Taiwan was in 1624, the founding year of Dutch Formosa. Between 1901 and the year 2000 there were 91 major earthquakes in Taiwan, 48 of them resulting in loss of life. The most recent major earthquake was the 921 earthquake, which struck on 21 September 1999, and claimed 2,415 lives.

Many modern buildings in Taiwan are constructed with earthquake safety in mind, including Taipei 101, which had to cope with the dual challenges of being flexible enough to withstand earthquakes, yet rigid enough to resist wind shear. The High Speed Rail system incorporates an automatic safety device to safely bring all trains to a halt when a significant earthquake is detected. Nevertheless, poor construction standards have been blamed for casualties in a number of major earthquakes, including the 1906 Meishan earthquake and the 1999 Jiji earthquake. Inside Taiwan the Central Weather Bureau is the organisation responsible for monitoring and reporting on earthquakes. Large earthquakes are also assessed by the United States Geological Survey. Scientific studies of the seismology of the island started in the Japanese era, when the first seismograph was installed in Taipei by Fusakichi Omori's company.

Earthquakes 

Significant earthquakes are listed here from 1736 to the present. Starting with the Japanese era in 1895 there were major improvements in detection technology, allowing more detailed gathering of data.

See also
Geology of Taiwan

References

Sources:
Central Weather Bureau
 Damage list 1900 before
 Damage list 1900 after
 damage list 2000 after
 MOTC-87-11 (PDF)

External links

Most recent earthquakes in Taiwan (English): Central Weather Bureau
Most recent earthquakes in Taiwan (Chinese): Central Weather Bureau (more detailed than the English version).
Most recent earthquakes in Taiwan (Chinese): Central Weather Bureau 

 
Taiwan
Earthquakes